Raymond Lawrence Perry (December 23, 1919 – May 3, 1973) was an American professional baseball player, manager and scout.  He was born in San Francisco.

A third baseman and second baseman, Perry played in the minors from 1940–1954, missing 1943–1945 due to service in World War II.

He was a player-manager as his career wound down and remained a minor league manager through 1961, when he became a scout for the Chicago Cubs. He was with the Cubs from 1961–1967, then was a scout for the New York Yankees from 1968–1969 and Los Angeles Dodgers (1970–1973).

Managing career
Redding Browns (1948–1951)
El Dorado Oilers (1952)
Bakersfield Indians (1953–1954)
Cedar Rapids Raiders (1955)
Reno Silver Sox (1956–1959)
Macon Dodgers (1961)
Lodi Crushers (1966)

References

James, Bill. The New Bill James Historical Baseball Abstract, 2001.

1919 births
1973 deaths
Bakersfield Indians players
Cedar Rapids Raiders players
Chicago Cubs scouts
El Dorado Oilers players
Little Rock Travelers players
Los Angeles Dodgers scouts
Macon Dodgers players
Minor league baseball managers
New York Yankees scouts
Redding Browns players
Reno Silver Sox players
Salt Lake City Bees players
San Diego Padres (minor league) players
San Francisco Seals (baseball) players
Baseball players from San Francisco
Tacoma Tigers players